This is a list of software systems that are used for visualizing microscopy data.

For each software system, the table below indicates which type of data can be displayed: EM = Electron microscopy; MG = Molecular graphics; Optical = Optical microscopy.

See also
 Biological data visualization
 List of molecular graphics systems

References

Electron microscopy
Microscopy
Molecular modelling software